Klokker i måneskinn (Bells in the Moonlight) is a Norwegian anthology film from 1964 directed by Kåre Bergstrøm. The film is about four men that have gathered for an evening of bridge. Three of them relate accounts of supernatural events, while the fourth is skeptical of their stories. The main roles are played by Lars Nordrum, Frank Robert, Rolf Søder, and Hans Stormoen. The film is based on André Bjerke's book Enhjørningen from 1963. Bjerke also wrote the screenplay.

Plot
Four men gather for an evening of bridge, but soon the conversation turns to mysterious events: mind transfer, occult phenomena, and not least of all the bells that behave so strangely in the moonlight. The group around the bridge table consists of a writer, a director, and a journalist, who all tell their own stories during the evening about supernatural experiences they believe they have been exposed to, as well as a psychiatrist who believes that everything like this has a natural explanation. He tries to analyze the stories of the others to convince them that there were natural causes behind their experiences.

The Author's Tale
The author engages a young female actor to play the lead role in his play. It is based on a real drama that occurred 150 years ago, when a young and beautiful socialite disappeared without a trace after playing a party game that involved making herself invisible. No one has been able to solve the mystery until the author, the female actor, and a male actor travel to the lady's old home. Over the course of two eerie days, they discover that the female actor identifies with the dead wife and sense the solution to the mystery.

The Director's Tale
The director experiences a crisis in his marriage. He has been completely bewitched by his wife's cousin and is tormented by guilt, but he still cannot get out of the relationship. However, mysterious things happen, caused by the director's daughter's doll. It has magical power and, among other things, can dance on moonbeams.

The Journalist's Tale
The journalist experiences something very strange when he decided to investigate an old shipwreck. The ship's pilot had steered directly onto a dangerous reef, and he was convicted and stripped of his pilot's license despite the fact that he had seen the beacons that were supposed to guide them around. The journalist has some strange dreams, and he believes that evil forces were behind the shipwreck. The journalist goes to the pilot's hometown, where he experiences several mysterious things.

Reception
Reviews in the newspapers Verdens Gang, Dagsavisen, and Aftenposten gave the film a "die throw" of four.

Cast

The Bridge Party
Henny Moan as the hostess
Lars Nordrum as the author
Frank Robert as the director
Rolf Søder as the journalist
Hans Stormoen as the psychiatrist

The Author's Tale
Erling Lindahl as Hamel the chamberlain
Henny Moan as the chamberlain's wife
Sverre Wilberg as Preben Berle
Erna Schøyen as the cook's maid
Liv Uchermann Selmer as the chambermaid
Turid Balke as the kitchen maid
Bjørg Engh as the maid
Andreas Diesen as the kitchen boy
Henny Moan as the actress
Sverre Wilberg as the actor

The Director's Tale
Randi Kolstad as the lady
Madeleine Borch as the daughter
Anita Thallaug as the model
Tore Foss as the pediatrician

The Journalist's Tale
Leif Enger as the art dealer
Stevelin Urdahl as a sailor
Knut Hultgren as a sailor
Alf Malland as the mate
Berit Søder as the journalist's wife
Vegard Hall as Zaubermann thepainter
Rønnaug Alten as Miss Fuhre
Henny Skjønberg as Mrs. Kjos
Egil Lorck as Hogne, the ship's captain

References

External links
 
 Klokker i måneskinn at the National Library of Norway
 Klokker i måneskinn at Filmfront

1964 films
Anthology films
Norwegian thriller films